Coscinocera hercules, the Hercules moth, is a moth of the family Saturniidae, endemic to New Guinea and northern Australia. The species was first described by William Henry Miskin in 1876.

Description 
They are mainly colored golden-brown and white, with transparent spots on each of the four wing sections – the coloring and patterns between sexes is mostly static. However, adult males have longer, slimmer tails on their wings than females do, making it somewhat easy to differentiate them in this way.

Their larvae grow up to 12 cm (about 4.7 in), and will weigh around 29 grams in their final instar.  They are a pale-blue or green color, with red dots along their sides and yellow spines.

Diet 
As an adult, the Hercules moth does not eat. Their larvae will feed on the leaves of rainforest trees such as Dysoxylum muelleri, Glochidion ferdinandi, Timonius rumphii, and Timonius singularis, but prefer to eat the leaves of the Bleeding Heart tree (Homalanthus populifolius).

References

External links
CSIRO - Australian Moths Online

Saturniinae
Moths described in 1876